The 2014–15 Providence Friars men's ice hockey team represented Providence College in the 2014–15 NCAA Division I men's ice hockey season. The team was coached by Nate Leaman, in his 4th season with the Friars. The Friars played their home games at Schneider Arena on campus in Providence, Rhode Island, competing in Hockey East.  On April 11, 2015, the Friars defeated the Boston University Terriers 4–3 at TD Garden to win the first national championship in program history.

Personnel

Roster
As of December 15, 2014.

Coaching staff

Standings

Schedule and results

|-
!colspan=12 style=""| Regular Season

|-
!colspan=12 style=""| Postseason

Statistics
Updated as of April 11, 2015.

Rankings

References

Providence Friars men's ice hockey seasons
Providence
Providence
Providence
Providence
Providence
Providence